The Mingun Pahtodawgyi is an incomplete monument stupa in Mingun, approximately  northwest of Mandalay in Sagaing Region in central Myanmar (formerly Burma). The ruins are the remains of a massive construction project begun by King Bodawpaya in 1790 which was intentionally left unfinished. The Pahtodawgyi is seen as the physical manifestation of Bodawpaya's well-known eccentricities. He set up an observation post on an island off Mingun to personally supervise the construction of the temple.

Incompletion

Bodaw Maung Wine used thousands of prisoners of war from Arakan. Which he deported 20,000 people to Central Burma slaves working on the construction of the stupa. The construction was also seen as taking a heavy toll on the people and the state. Thus a prophecy was allegedly created to stop the project. The approach in conveying the dissatisfaction was allegedly to utilize the King's deep superstition. According to the prophecy, "as soon as the building of the pagoda was over, the country would also be gone".

A variation states that king would die once the project was completed. Thus, construction was slowed to prevent the prophecy's realisation and when the king died, the project was completely halted.

However, it holds the record for being the largest pile of bricks in the world.

Current condition
By the time the construction project was abandoned, the pagoda had attained a height of 50 metres, one third of the intended height. 
An earthquake on 23 March 1839 caused huge cracks to appear on the face of the remaining structure. 
The temple serves more as an attraction than a religious site. However, a small shrine with a Buddha image still serves its purpose as a place of worship and meditation. Pondaw paya or a working model of the stupa can be seen nearby.

Mingun Bell

King Bodawpaya also had a gigantic bell cast to go with his huge stupa. The Mingun Bell, weighing at 90 tons, is today the second largest ringing bell in the world. The weight of the bell in Burmese measurement, is 55,555 viss or peiktha (1 viss = 1.63 kg), handed down as a mnemonic "Min Hpyu Hman Hman Pyaw", with the consonants representing the number 5 in Burmese astronomy and numerology.

Accessibility
Mingun can be reached by a ferry across the Irrawaddy river from Mandalay and then optionally by foot or by bullock cart from the river jetty.

See also

Hsinphyumae Pagoda
Bodawpaya

References

Tourist attractions in Myanmar
Buddhist temples in Myanmar
Buddhist pilgrimage sites in Myanmar
Buildings and structures in Sagaing Region